James Thomas Roberts (1871–1964), more commonly known as J. T. Roberts, was a Sierra Leonean minister and educationalist who was principal of Methodist Boys High School. He immigrated to the Gold Coast in 1922 and founded Accra High School in 1923. Roberts also founded the Asante Collegiate school now known as Osei Kyeretwie Secondary School. Roberts is highly regarded as one of the best Sierra Leonean expatriates and  educationalists to Ghana, where he is still highly regarded for his educational work. J.T Roberts was married to his wife Florence and had seven children, Edith, Frank, Edina, Ralph, Elsie, Lewis and Ethel.

Background and early life
James Thomas Roberts was born in 1871 in Freetown, Sierra Leone, to Creole parents. At the age of eighteen, Roberts was already teaching at the Methodist Boy's High School during the tenure of Principal May. May, who was closely associated with the institution, eventually retired.

Sources
Yesterday's Africans by Bankole Timothy

Sierra Leone Creole people
1871 births
1956 deaths